Aneflomorpha martini is a species of beetle in the family Cerambycidae. It was described by Chemsak and Linsley in 1968.

References

Aneflomorpha
Beetles described in 1968